Swan Lake is an unincorporated community located in Tallahatchie County, Mississippi. Swan Lake has a post office with ZIP code 38958. It is unclear when Swan Lake became an official community, but it was thought to be in the early to mid 20th century. It was started by a wealthy farmer named Bob Flautt. His labor and cotton gin were located in the most central part of his plantation. Swan Lake is actually the name of a lake about a mile north of the gin lot. Eventually the name was given to the plantation. Catfish ponds were eventually built that would parallel the gin lot. A small crop dusting airport would be installed as well as a store and post office.

References

Gallery

Unincorporated communities in Tallahatchie County, Mississippi
Unincorporated communities in Mississippi